Las Cruces may refer to:

Places

Guatemala
 Las Cruces, Petén

Panama
 Las Cruces, Los Santos
 Las Cruces, Veraguas

United States
 Las Cruces, California
 Las Cruces, New Mexico  (New Mexico's second-largest city)
 The main campus of New Mexico State University
 Las Cruces International Airport in New Mexico

Other uses
 Las Cruces (band), doom metal band from Las Cruces, New Mexico
 Battle of Monte de las Cruces, in the Mexican War of Independence

br:Cruces
es:Cruces